Kandamangalam may refer to:
 Kandamangalam (state assembly constituency)
 Kandamangalam block